General Vasco Mascarenhas, 1st Count of Óbidos, OC (c. 1605–4 July 1678), was a Portuguese nobleman and colonial governor, who was Governor General of Brazil, Viceroy of Brazil and Viceroy of India.

He was the son of Fernão Martins Mascarenhas, Lord of Lavre, and his wife, Maria of Lancaster, great-grandchild of Dinis of Braganza, Count of Lemos and a dynast of the House of Lancaster and of the House of Braganza.

See also
Portuguese Royal Family
Portuguese Empire

References

Viceroys of Portuguese India
1605 births
1678 deaths
Portuguese colonial governors and administrators
Portuguese soldiers
1600s in Portuguese India
17th-century Portuguese people